The women's 400 metres event at the 2021 European Athletics Indoor Championships was held on 5 March 2021 at 11:22 (heats) and at 19:33 (semi-finals), and on 6 March 2021 at 20:25 (final) local time.

Medalists

Records

Results
Having run 50.64 earlier in the winter, the fastest time by a European woman since 2009, Femke Bol entered the Championships as the overwhelming favorite. Her Dutch teammate, Lieke Klaver, was the second-fastest European woman of the indoor season with 51.21, a top 5 time by a European woman in the last ten years and over half a second faster than the third fastest woman of the season. Other contenders who ran under 52 seconds prior to the Championships included 2019 European indoor and world outdoor finalist Justyna Święty-Ersetic, 2016 European Youth Champion and 2019 European U23 bronze medallist Andrea Miklos and the Irish 100m and 200m outdoor national record holder Phil Healy. The defending 2019 champion Léa Sprunger was the 13th fastest European woman of the indoor season going into the Championships.

All five women who ran under 52 seconds prior to the Championships made the final. The surprise sixth spot went the British 200m specialist Jodie Williams, who was contesting her first 400m at a major Championships. Starting in lane 6, Bol took her first 100m conservatively, and her Dutch teammate Klaver was the first one at the break. Bol took the lead at the back straight of the second lap, and by the 300m mark it was Bol, followed by Klaver and Święty-Ersetic. The last 50m saw Klaver tie up, with Święty-Ersetic moving into second place and Williams into third. Bol's winning time of 50.63 was a 0.01 second improvement of her own National Record and the fastest winning time at the European Indoor Championships since 2007. It was Bol's first international senior individual medal. Three finalists set personal bests in the final.

Heats
Qualification: First 2 in each heat (Q) and the next fastest 4 (q) advance to the Semifinals.

Semifinals
Qualification: First 2 in each heat (Q) advance to the Final.

Final

References

2021 European Athletics Indoor Championships
400 metres at the European Athletics Indoor Championships
European